was the third vessel to be commissioned in the 19-vessel  destroyers built for the Imperial Japanese Navy in the late-1930s under the Circle Three Supplementary Naval Expansion Program (Maru San Keikaku).

Background
The Kagerō-class destroyers were outwardly almost identical to the preceding light cruiser-sized , with improvements made by Japanese naval architects to improve stability and to take advantage of Japan’s lead in torpedo technology. They were designed to accompany the Japanese main striking force and in both day and night attacks against the United States Navy as it advanced across the Pacific Ocean, according to Japanese naval strategic projections. Despite being one of the most powerful classes of destroyers in the world at the time of their completion, only one survived the Pacific War.

 Kuroshio, built at the Fujinagata Shipyards in Osaka, was laid down on 31 August 1937, launched on 25 October 1938 and commissioned on 27 January 1940.

Operational history
Shortly after commissioning, Kuroshio was assigned to participate in the 16th Annual Maneuvers of the Combined Fleet.

At the time of the attack on Pearl Harbor, Kuroshio, was assigned to Destroyer Division 15 (Desdiv 15), and a member of Destroyer Squadron 2 (Desron 2) of the IJN 2nd Fleet, and had deployed from Palau, as part of the escort for the aircraft carrier  in the invasion of the southern Philippines and minelayer . She suffered minor damage on 23 December due to a strafing attack by USAAF B-17 Flying Fortress bombers.

In early 1942, Kuroshio participated in the invasion of the Netherlands East Indies, escorting the invasion forces for Menado, Kendari and Ambon in January, and the invasion forces for Makassar, Timor and Java in February. On 8 February, she rescued survivors from Natsushio and on 5 March assisted the destroyer  in sinking a Royal Navy minelayer.

At the end of April, Kuroshio deployed from Kure to assist in the occupation of the Cagayan Islands near Palawan in early May, and then returned with the damaged aircraft carrier  from Manila to Kure on 17 May. In early June, Kuroshio deployed from Saipan as part of the troopship escort for the Battle of Midway.

During the Battle of the Eastern Solomons of 24 August she was part of Admiral Kondō’s Advance Force, but was not in combat. During September, Kuroshio was used for patrols between Truk and Guadalcanal, and in October began operations as a “Tokyo Express" high speed troop transport to Guadalcanal. These operations continued to mid-February 1943. During the Battle of Santa Cruz on 26 October, she was assigned to escort the aircraft carrier . Kuroshio was also at the Battle of Tassafaronga on 30 November, during which one of her torpedoes may have hit the American cruiser .
 
At the end of April, she was at Shortland Island, and reassigned to troop transport runs.

On the night of 7–8 May 1943, while on a troop transport run to Kolombangara, she struck mines when leaving Vila (Kolombangara), and exploded and sank at coordinates, with loss of 83 lives. She was removed from the navy list on 20 June 1943.

See also 
 List of ships of the Japanese Navy

Notes

Books

External links
 CombinedFleet.com: Kagero-class destroyers
  Kuroshio history

Kuroshio
Kuroshio
Shipwrecks in the Solomon Sea
World War II shipwrecks in the Pacific Ocean
1938 ships
Maritime incidents in June 1941
Maritime incidents in May 1943
Ships sunk by mines
Ships built by Fujinagata Shipyards
Naval magazine explosions